Gurabo is a town and municipality in eastern Puerto Rico. It is located in the central eastern region, north of San Lorenzo; south of Trujillo Alto; east of Caguas; and west of Carolina and Juncos. Gurabo is spread over 9 barrios and Gurabo Pueblo (the downtown area and the administrative center of the city). It is part of the San Juan-Caguas-Guaynabo Metropolitan Statistical Area.

History
Gurabo's history dates as far back as the 17th century, when it was actually part of Caguas. Then, the area was known as Burabo. By 1700, transportation, medical and economic troubles were crippling the population of the Burabo area; traveling to Caguas' center for business and medical help was not easy and took hours. This led many of Burabos citizens to seek autonomy for the area.

It would be long, however, before Gurabo was separated from Caguas. The separation movement was brought forward by an 1812 meeting of all 168 family leaders in Gurabo, who decided to have Luis del Carmen Echevarría lead them in their quest for independence, based on the large number of residents in Burabo.

In 1815, Gurabo became a municipality. In 1822, the first Catholic church in town was erected. In 1903, the first Baptist church opened its doors in Gurabo town.

Gurabo is also known as "La Ciudad de las Escaleras", or the "City of Stairs". Located in the town center district of El Cerro, the stairs (step streets) are about twenty-two floors high, and they are painted in bright colors.

Gurabo's mayor is Rosachely Rivera Santana.

The significant amount of rainfall from Hurricane Maria triggered numerous landslides in Gurabo on September 20, 2017. Many people had to be rescued from floods and 489 homes were destroyed.

Geography
Gurabo is located on the east side of Puerto Rico in the Caguas Valley.

Bodies of water
Located in Gurabo are a number of rivers, streams, and unnamed creeks.
The main river to cross the municipality is the Gurabo and a portion of the Loíza River runs through Gurabo. 
In 2018, the U.S. Army Corps of Engineers announced work would be done on Gurabo River.

Barrios

Like all municipalities of Puerto Rico, Gurabo is subdivided into barrios.

Celada
Gurabo barrio-pueblo
Hato Nuevo
Jaguar
Jaguas
Mamey
Masa
Navarro
Quebrada Infierno
Rincón

Sectors

Barrios (which are like minor civil divisions) in turn are further subdivided into smaller local populated place areas/units called sectores''' (sectors in English). The types of sectores may vary, from normally sector to urbanización to reparto to barriada to residencial, among others.

Special Communities

 (Special Communities of Puerto Rico) are marginalized communities whose citizens are experiencing a certain amount of social exclusion. A map shows these communities occur in nearly every municipality of the commonwealth. Of the 742 places that were on the list in 2014, the following barrios, communities, sectors, or neighborhoods were in Gurabo: El Cerro, Estancias de Hato Nuevo, and Villa Alegre.

Climate

Economy
Agriculture
Dairy farms

Industry
Manufacturing (metal, paper, plastics, chemicals, pharmaceuticals, textiles, electrical and electronic equipment, and electrical machinery).

Tourism
Landmarks and places of interest
Some landmarks and places of interest in Gurabo include:
  - Exhibition Center
 El Cerro
 Former City Hall and Clock
 Church of San José
 Luis Muñoz Marín Plaza (main square of the downtown area)
  - Mirador Estate
 University of Turabo Museum
 Cofresí Park

Culture
Festivals and events
Gurabo celebrates its patron saint festival in March. The  is a religious and cultural celebration that generally features parades, games, artisans, amusement rides, regional food, and live entertainment.

Other festivals and events celebrated in Gurabo include:
 , which roughly translates to the "Festival of the person who is down on their luck''". The seventh annual fair was held in May, 2017. With the assistance of a local bank, funds are collected to help any person in the community with severe medical needs.
 Home Garden Festival (May)
 Youth Festival (May)
 Mapeyé Festival (October)

Sports
Gurabo has a baseball academy named Puerto Rico Baseball Academy and High School (PRBAHS).

Colegio Bautista de Gurabo (Sports: Volleyball, Soccer, Basketball, Softball, Track and Field.) colegiobautistadegurabo.com

Demographics

In 2000, Gurabo had a population of 36,743 and in 2010 it had a population of 45,369. In 2020, the population dropped to 40,622.

Government

Like all municipalities in Puerto Rico, Gurabo is administered by a mayor. The current mayor is Rosachely Rivera, from the New Progressive Party (PNP). Rivera was elected at the Gurabo mayor special election, 2017.

The city belongs to the Puerto Rico Senatorial district VII, which is represented by two Senators. In 2016, Miguel Laureano and José Luis Dalmau were elected as District Senators.

Transportation 
There are 20 bridges in Gurabo.

Symbols
The  has an official flag and coat of arms.

Flag
With eleven stripes, six green and five yellow, alternated, the yellow with the superior (top) edge indented forming a stairway.

Coat of arms
In a green field resides a widened gold patriarchal cross. Below the bottom arm are two shields in silver. The one on the left has a fleur de lis and the one on the right three lilies with stems in a natural way. Three towers in gold crown the shield.

Education
Ana G. Mendez University, Gurabo campus in Navarro
Puerto Rico Criminal Justice College - Gurabo campus (Puerto Rico Police Academy)

See also

List of Puerto Ricans
History of Puerto Rico
Did you know-Puerto Rico?

References

External links
 Welcome to Puerto Rico! Gurabo

 
Municipalities of Puerto Rico
Populated places established in 1815
San Juan–Caguas–Guaynabo metropolitan area
1815 establishments in Puerto Rico